Valle del Guamez is a town and municipality located in the Putumayo Department, Republic of Colombia.

Municipalities of Putumayo Department